Filippo Galli (1783 – 3 June 1853, in Paris) was an Italian opera singer who began his career as a tenor in 1801 but went on to become one of the most acclaimed basses of the bel canto era, with a voice known for its wide range, extreme agility, and expressivity, and a remarkable gift for acting.

Early life
Born in Rome, Galli was a marginal buffo tenor, appearing in Naples, Bologna, Parma, and Turin, primarily in the works of Nasolini, Generali, and Zingarelli. It is said that following an illness in 1810, his voice changed markedly into that of bass, but this may have been a cover story for his technical transition into the bass repertoire upon the advice of the composer Giovanni Paisiello or singer Luigi Marchesi. Galli's younger brother Vincenzo was also an opera singer noted for his performances in basso buffo roles.

Career as bass 

His new career took rise in 1812: his meeting with Rossini  allowed him to sing L'inganno felice on 1 August at the Teatro San Moisè, Venice (in the role of Tarabotto). After his creation of Polidoro in Pietro Generali's La vedova stravagante, he appeared in a new opera by Rossini—La pietra del paragone on 26 September 1812. His performance in the "Sigillara" aria was the hit of the immensely successful opera. His collaboration with Rossini increased: on 22 May 1813 he sang Mustafà in the premiere of L'italiana in Algeri at the Teatro San Benedetto in Venice. Rossini then composed numerous other bass parts specifically for Galli. On 14 August 1814 he appeared in Il turco in Italia at La Scala; on 31 May 1817 (again at La Scala), in the very difficult role of Fernando in La gazza ladra. The title role in Maometto II followed on 3 December 1820 at the Teatro di San Carlo, Naples plus, on 3 February 1823, he sang the role of Assur in Semiramide at La Fenice in Venice.

Galli also created the role of Enrico (Henry) VIII in Donizetti's Anna Bolena at the Teatro Carcano in Milan.

Repertoire
This is an alphabetical list of Filippo Galli's roles:

Adolfo, in Carlo Coccia's La donna selvaggia
Adolfo, in Carlo Evasio Soliva's La testa di bronzo o sia La capanna solitaria
Assur, in Gioachino Rossini's Semiramide
Batone, in Gioachino Rossini's L'inganno felice
Conte Asdrubale, in Gioachino Rossini's La pietra del paragone
Dandini, in Stefano Pavesi's Agatina ovvero La virtù premiata
Dandini, in Gioachino Rossini's La Cenerentola
Don Giovanni, in Wolfgang Amadeus Mozart's Don Giovanni
Duca d'Ordowo, in Gioachino Rossini's Torvaldo e Dorliska
Elpino, in Gioachino Rossini's 1822 cantata Il vero omaggio
Enrico VIII, in Gaetano Donizetti's Anna Bolena
Fernando Villabella, in Gioachino Rossini's La gazza ladra
Figaro, in Wolfgang Amadeus Mozart's Le nozze di Figaro
Gabriel, in François-Adrien Boieldieu's La dama bianca
Geronimo, in Domenico Cimarosa's Il matrimonio segreto
Giove, in Vittorio Trento's Andromeda
Gondair, in Giovanni Pacini's Gli arabi nelle Gallie
Ircano, in Gioachino Rossini's Ricciardo e Zoraide
Maometto II, by Gioachino Rossini
Mercurio, in Pietro Casella's Paride
Mustafà, in Gioachino Rossini's L'italiana in Algeri
Oroveso, in Vincenzo Bellini's Norma
Papageno, in Wolfgang Amadeus Mozart's Die Zauberflöte
Podesta di Firenze, in Giovanni Pacini's Isabella ed Enrico
Polidoro, in Pietro Generali's La vedova stravagante
Richard, in Joseph Weigl's La famiglia svizzera
Selim, in Gioachino Rossini's Il turco in Italia
Teodoro, in Giovanni Pacini's Il Barone di Dolsheim

Sources
Warrack, John and West, Ewan (1992), The Oxford Dictionary of Opera, 782 pages,  

Operatic basses
19th-century Italian male opera singers
1783 births
1853 deaths